Discovery Gardens is a rapid transit station on the Route 2020 branch of the Red Line of the Dubai Metro in Dubai, UAE, serving Discovery Gardens and surrounding areas in Jebel Ali.

The station opened as part of Route 2020, created to link to Expo 2020, on 1 January 2021. It is located on an elevated section of the metro above Gardens Boulevard (D591), on the southwest boundary of Discovery Gardens, just southeast of the junction with Al Asayel Street (D72).

References

Railway stations in the United Arab Emirates opened in 2021
Dubai Metro stations